Blue Plains may refer to:

Blue Plains (Washington, D.C.), an historic locale in the United States
Blue Plains Advanced Wastewater Treatment Plant